Action Stations! is a 1990 video game published by Conflict Analytics.

Action Stations! Scenario Utility Disk was also released.

Gameplay
Action Stations! is a game in which the surface officer's art of war at sea is simulated.

Each player gives orders to their ships for the next 3 minutes of game time. The orders are then executed simultaneously.

Game play includes provisions for salvo chasing, spotting of the fall of shot by aircraft, flares dropping by aircraft and the use of smoke for cover. There are scenarios from a small one with the German Graf Spee against 3 Allied cruisers to large scenarios like the battles around Ironbottom Sound.

Each ship has detailed armor specifications and comprehensive data about the types of guns each has with rates of fire and penetration being taken into account.

Reception
Lt. H. E. Dille reviewed the game for Computer Gaming World, and stated that it was "a superlative first effort. The play value is superb and completion of all the scenarios included with the game could take players up to a year of standard play to master."

Bob Proctor reviewed the Action Stations! Scenario Utility Disk for Computer Gaming World, and stated that "No matter how much one enjoys the basic Action Stations! program, this new module offers something to extend every wargamer's enjoyment of the product."

Reviews
Raze - Nov, 1990
Zzap! - May, 1991
ASM (Aktueller Software Markt) - May, 1991
Computer Gaming World - Nov, 1991

References

1990 video games
Amiga games
Computer wargames
DOS games
Naval video games
Turn-based strategy video games
Video games developed in the United States
Video games set in the 1920s
Video games set in the 1930s
World War II video games